António Filipe de Sousa Gouveia (born 12 May 1973) is a Portuguese football manager and former player who played as a central midfielder. He is the current manager of Saudi Arabian club Al-Hazem.

He amassed Primeira Liga totals of 174 matches and 17 goals over eight seasons, representing Farense, Belenenses, Boavista, Paços de Ferreira, Nacional and Gil Vicente. He added 159 appearances and 21 goals in the Segunda Liga, in a 19-year senior career.

Gouveia started working as a manager in 2011.

Playing career
Born in the Porto outskirts of Massarelos, Gouveia played youth football with five clubs, having two separate spells at Sport Clube Senhora da Hora. He made his senior debut with Varzim S.C. in the 1991–92 season, and continued competing in the third division the following years.

From 1995 to 1998, Gouveia represented C.F. União and F.C. Paços de Ferreira, with both clubs in the Segunda Liga. Subsequently, he signed with S.C. Farense, playing his first match in the Primeira Liga on 12 September 1998 against FC Porto (90 minutes played, 2–0 away loss).

On the last day of the 2000 January transfer window, Gouveia was loaned by C.F. Os Belenenses to Montpellier HSC in the French Ligue 1, alongside teammate Rui Pataca. At the end of the campaign he returned to Portugal, joining Boavista FC; he contributed eight substitute appearances in his first year, as the Chequereds won their first and only national championship.

Gouveia moved to C.D. Nacional in summer 2002, proceeding to enjoy his most steady period and leaving after three top-flight seasons and competitive totals of 92 games and 12 goals. He signed with Gil Vicente F.C. on a free transfer on 7 June 2005 and, after appearing in just five matches in the first half of 2006–07, with the team again in the second tier, he joined F.C. Vizela of the same league.

On 23 June 2007, Gouveia signed a one-year deal with C.D. Aves, recently relegated from the top flight. After a spell with amateurs AC Vila Meã, he retired in 2010 at the age of 37.

Coaching career
Immediately after retiring, Gouveia returned to Boavista to manage the junior side. Two months later, he replaced Rui Ferreira at the main squad.

Gouveia worked with Académica de Coimbra from 2011 to 2013, under Pedro Emanuel. He was part of the squad that reached their first Taça de Portugal final since 1939, defeating Sporting CP on 19 May 2012.

On 20 June 2013, Gouveia was named new head coach of S.C. Salgueiros. He was fired just three months later, following a string of poor results.

Gouveia was appointed at C.D. Santa Clara on 2 December 2014, following the sacking of Cláudio Braga. His first game in charge took place the following week, and his team defeated Leixões S.C. 2–0 at home.

After José Viterbo's resignation, Académica announced the return of Gouveia in September 2015, this time as the new head coach. His first league match at the helm was at Rio Ave F.C. on the 28th (1–0 loss), and he only managed to collect six wins until the end of the season, in an eventual return to the second tier after a 14-year stay.

On 3 June 2016, Gouveia was appointed manager of second-division club S.C. Covilhã on 3 June 2016. He led the side to the eighth position in his debut campaign, being relieved of his duties on 14 September 2017 due to poor results.

In June 2018, Gouveia was hired at Leixões after Francisco Chaló left for Algeria. He was dismissed that 23 December after a 1–2 home defeat to C.D. Cova da Piedade, with the team in 13th place and in the quarter-finals of the domestic cup.

Gouveia signed with Saudi First Division League's Al-Jabalain FC on 11 July 2019. He returned to Portugal two years later, with second-tier U.D. Vilafranquense.

On 5 July 2022, Gouveia returned to Saudi Arabia and its division two by agreeing to a contract at Al-Hazem FC.

Managerial statistics

Honours

Player
Boavista
Primeira Liga: 2000–01

References

External links

1973 births
Living people
Portuguese footballers
Footballers from Porto
Association football midfielders
Primeira Liga players
Liga Portugal 2 players
Segunda Divisão players
Varzim S.C. players
Amarante F.C. players
C.F. União players
F.C. Paços de Ferreira players
S.C. Farense players
C.F. Os Belenenses players
Boavista F.C. players
C.D. Nacional players
Gil Vicente F.C. players
F.C. Vizela players
C.D. Aves players
AC Vila Meã players
Ligue 1 players
Montpellier HSC players
Portuguese expatriate footballers
Expatriate footballers in France
Portuguese expatriate sportspeople in France
Portuguese football managers
Primeira Liga managers
Liga Portugal 2 managers
Boavista F.C. managers
C.D. Santa Clara managers
Associação Académica de Coimbra – O.A.F. managers
S.C. Covilhã managers
Leixões S.C. managers
Saudi First Division League managers
Al-Hazm FC managers
Portuguese expatriate football managers
Expatriate football managers in Saudi Arabia
Portuguese expatriate sportspeople in Saudi Arabia